Piyacuyani (possibly from Aymara p'iya hole, qhuya the hole for the seed; mine or hole from which metal is taken, -ni a suffix to indicate ownership) is a mountain in the Vilcanota mountain range in the Andes of Peru, about  high. The mountain is located in the Puno Region, Melgar Province, Nuñoa District. Piyacuyani lies southwest of Jonorana, west of Jarupata, north of Huisahuisa, northeast of Jatun Sallica and Jochajucho, and southeast of Jampatune, Pomanota and Jatuncucho. It is situated west of Llankamayu, a right tributary of Hatun Mayu.

References

Mountains of Puno Region
Mountains of Peru